Bedil is a term from Maritime Southeast Asia which refers to various types of firearms and gunpowder weapons, from small pistols to large siege guns. The term bedil comes from wedil (or wediyal) and wediluppu (or wediyuppu) in the Tamil language. In their original form, these words refer to gunpowder blast and saltpeter, respectively. But after being absorbed into bedil in the Malay language, and in a number of other cultures in the archipelago, that Tamil vocabulary is used to refer to all types of weapons that use gunpowder. The terms bedil and bedhil are known in Javanese and Balinese, in Sundanese the term is bedil, in Batak it is known as bodil, in Makasarese, badili, in Buginese, balili, in Dayak language, badil, in Tagalog, baril, in Bisayan, bádil, in Bikol languages, badil, and in Malay it is badel or bedil.

History 
It is possible that gunpowder weapons were used in Java by Kublai Khan's Chinese forces who sought to invade Java in 1293. The Javanese gun used in the Majapahit era has also been referred to as bedil.

The knowledge of making "true" firearms probably came to Southeast Asia in the late fifteenth century via the Islamic nations of West Asia, most probably the Arabs. The precise year of introduction is unknown, but it may be safely concluded to be no earlier than 1460. This resulted in the development of Java arquebus, which was also called a bedil. Portuguese influence on local weaponry after the capture of Malacca (1511), resulted in a new type of hybrid tradition matchlock firearm, the istinggar.

Portuguese and Spanish invaders were unpleasantly surprised and even outgunned on occasion. Duarte Barbosa recorded the abundance of gunpowder-based weapons in Java ca. 1514. The Javanese were deemed as expert gun casters and good artillerymen. The weapon found there include one-pounder cannons, long muskets, spingarde (arquebus), schioppi (hand cannon), Greek fire, guns (cannons), and other fire-works. When Malacca fell to the Portuguese in 1511 A.D., breech-loading swivel guns (cetbang) and muzzle-loading swivel guns (lela and rentaka) were found and captured by the Portuguese. In the battle, the Malays were using cannons, matchlock guns, and "firing tubes". By the early 16th century, the Javanese already locally produced large guns, some of them still survived until the present day and are dubbed as "sacred cannon" or "holy cannon". These cannons varied between 180 and 260-pounders, weighing anywhere between 3–8 tons, length of them between 3–6 m.

Saltpeter harvesting was recorded by Dutch and German travelers as being common in even the smallest villages and was collected from the decomposition process of large dung hills specifically piled for the purpose. The Dutch punishment for possession of non-permitted gunpowder appears to have been amputation. Ownership and manufacture of gunpowder was later prohibited by the colonial Dutch occupiers. According to colonel McKenzie quoted in Sir Thomas Stamford Raffles', The History of Java (1817), the purest sulfur was supplied from a crater from a mountain near the straits of Bali.

For firearms using flintlock mechanism, the inhabitants of the Nusantara archipelago are reliant on Western powers, as no local smith could produce such complex components. These flintlock firearms are completely different weapons and were known by another name, senapan or senapang, from the Dutch word snappaan. The gun-making areas of Nusantara could make these senapan, the barrel and the wooden part is made locally, but the mechanism is imported from the European colonist.

List of weapon classified as bedil 

Below are weapons historically may be referred to as bedil. The full description should be found on their respective pages. It is sorted alphabetically.

Bedil tombak 
Locally-made pole gun-type hand cannon.

Cetbang 
Refer to 2 type of gunpowder weapon used by Majapahit.

Ekor lotong 
Swivel gun with tiller resembling lutung monkey's tail.

Istinggar 
A type of matchlock firearm, result of Portuguese influence to local weaponry, particularly after the capture of Malacca (1511).

Java arquebus 
Java arquebus is an early long matchlock firearm from Java, used before the arrival of Iberian explorers.

Lantaka 
Lantaka is a type of bronze portable cannon or swivel gun, mounted on merchant vessels and warships in Maritime Southeast Asia.

Lela 
Lela is a type of cannon, similar but larger in dimension to rentaka.

Meriam 
Formerly used for a kind of cannon, now it is de facto Malaysian and Indonesian term for cannon.

Miniature meriam kecil 
Also known as currency cannon, this firearm is produced mainly for trading and novelty item.

Pemuras 
Native name for blunderbuss.

Rentaka 
Native swivel gun, very popular among the Malays.

Terakul 
A type of dragoon pistol, used mainly by sailor and pirates.

See also 

 Firearm
 Cannon
 Artillery

References 

Cannon
Indonesian inventions
Artillery
Firearms
Projectile weapons
Gunpowder
Weapons of Indonesia
Early firearms
15th-century military history